The MacDonald Hills are a compact group of exposed rock hills in the Asgard Range, east of Commonwealth Glacier on the north side of lower Taylor Valley, Victoria Land, Antarctica. They are separated from Hjorth Hill by Quinn Gully.  

The hills were named by the Advisory Committee on Antarctic Names (US-ACAN) (1997) after William R. MacDonald (1925–77), Chief of the Branch of International Activities, U.S. Geological Survey, and a member of the US-ACAN, part of the U.S. Board on Geographic Names, 1976–77.

Named features

Peaks 
 Mount Coleman: .
 Harp Hill: 
 Mount Knox:

Cirques 
At  elevation, the cirque rises above the terminus of Commonwealth Glacier immediately southward. Colony Cirque is a cirque immediately east of Mount Knox. Both were named by the New Zealand Geographic Board in 1998 for methods of administrating land, complementing the adjacent Commonwealth Glacier, named earlier by Captain R. F. Scott after the Commonwealth of Australia.

See also
 MacDonald Peak

References

Asgard Range
Hills of Victoria Land
McMurdo Dry Valleys